Magandang Buhay is a Philippine morning talk show that premiered on April 18, 2016, and airs every Monday to Friday at 09:00 (PST), replacing Kris TV. The show was originally broadcast on ABS-CBN until the network's shutdown in 2020. It is currently broadcast on cable channel Kapamilya Channel and free-to-air channel A2Z and TV5.

Karla Estrada, Melai Cantiveros-Francisco and Jolina Magdangal-Escueta originally served as the main hosts until Estrada's departure in 2022 following her congressional bid. Estrada was replaced by Regine Velasquez-Alcasid.

History

The title is inspired from a popular line of the same name from the drama series Dream Dad.

Magandang Buhay debuted on ABS-CBN every Monday to Friday at 07:30 (PST) on April 18, 2016, replacing Kris TV. On June 21, 2016, the show moved its time slot to 08:00 (PST) onwards.

On March 26, 2020, Magandang Buhay was broadcast via Zoom due to the COVID-19 pandemic's enhanced community quarantine in Luzon. The show got suspended on May 5, 2020, after ABS-CBN ceased its free-to-air broadcast operations as ordered by the National Telecommunications Commission (NTC) and Solicitor General Jose Calida. On June 15, 2020, the show resumed its live studio broadcast during the launch of Kapamilya Channel. On October 19, 2020, the show's time slot moved to 10:30 (PST) following its simulcast on A2Z. A week later, October 26, the show's runtime reduced to 60 minutes, airing it at 11:00 (PST). On June 14, 2021, the show reverted its time slot to 09:00 (PST) onwards.

Karla Estrada temporarily left the show due to her commitment with Tingog Party List in the 2022 elections. Regine Velasquez and Judy Ann Santos each served as guest co-host during Estrada's absence. In a taped episode aired on July 22, 2022, Estrada returned for her final appearance on the show after 6 years. On August 8, 2022, Velasquez officially became a regular host in the talk show, along with a new version of the theme song as part of its 6th year anniversary activities.

TV5 simulcast
In a trade event on November 23, 2022, it was announced that Magandang Buhay will be part of 2023 programming for TV5. It premiered on TV5 on February 6, 2023, at 9:00 a.m., replacing the now-defunct Chika, Besh!. The program served as a pre-programming to morning newscast Frontline sa Umaga. This will be the latest ABS-CBN-produced program to be simulcast to TV5.

Hosts

Main hosts
Regine Velasquez-Alcasid
Melai Cantiveros-Francisco
Jolina Magdangal-Escueta

Horoscope segment
Hanz Cua

Former host
Karla Estrada (2016–2022)

Occasional guest co-hosts
Bianca Gonzalez
Cristine Reyes
Dimples Romana
Jodi Sta. Maria
Janice de Belen
Lara Quigaman
Sunshine Dizon
Tuesday Vargas
Gelli de Belen
Ogie Diaz
Judy Ann Santos

See also
 List of programs broadcast by ABS-CBN
 List of programs broadcast by Kapamilya Channel
 List of programs broadcast by A2Z (Philippine TV channel)
 List of programs broadcast by TV5 (Philippine TV network)

References

External links

ABS-CBN original programming
2016 Philippine television series debuts
2020s Philippine television series
Breakfast television in the Philippines
Filipino-language television shows
Philippine television talk shows
Television productions suspended due to the COVID-19 pandemic